The 49th Annual GMA Dove Awards presentation ceremony were held on Tuesday, October 16, 2018 at the Allen Arena located in Nashville, Tennessee. The ceremony recognized the accomplishments of musicians and other figures within the Christian music industry for the year 2018. The ceremony was produced by the Trinity Broadcasting Network. The awards show aired on the Trinity Broadcasting Network on Sunday, October 21, 2018 at 8 p.m. CT.

On August 8, 2018, the Gospel Music Association announced with Francesca Battistelli and Travis Greene on Facebook Live, the nominees for the 49th Annual GMA Dove Awards, themed Reverent Wonder. Going into the awards, producer and songwriter Colby Wedgeworth had the most nominations with eight, with Tauren Wells leading the artist nominations with seven nominations. The big winners of the night were Tauren Wells with four awards, with Cory Asbury and Colby Wedgeworth receiving three awards each.

Performers 
The following musical artists performed at the 49th GMA Dove Awards:
 1K Phew
 Trace Adkins
 Cory Asbury
 Big Daddy Weave
 Anthony Brown & group therAPY
 Jekalyn Carr
 Jason Crabb
 Lauren Daigle
 for KING & COUNTRY
 Kirk Franklin
 Koryn Hawthorne
 Joel Houston
 KB
 Tori Kelly
 Natalie Grant
 Newsboys
 Rascal Flatts
 Social Club Misfits
 Rebecca St. James
 The Walls Group
 Tauren Wells
 Zach Williams

Presenters 
The following served as presenters at the 49th GMA Dove Awards:
 Trace Adkins
 Pat Barrett
 Ricky Dillard
 Erwin Brothers
 Jordan Feliz
 DeVon Franklin
 Bill Gaither
 Joseph Habedank
 Israel Houghton
 Joel Houston
 Michael Huppe (SoundExchange)
 Brian & Jenn Johnson
 Dr. Bobby Jones
 Tasha Cobbs Leonard
 Mark Lowry
 Matt Maher
 Jonathan McReynolds
 Bart Millard
 Jasmine Murray
 Chonda Pierce
 Rebecca St. James
 Marvin Sapp
 Russ Taff
 Chris Tomlin
 The Walls Group
 Matthew West
 Brian Courtney Wilson
 Deborah Joy Winans

Nominees and winners 
This is a complete list of the nominees for the 49th GMA Dove Awards. The winners are in bold.

General 

Song of the Year
"All My Hope"
(writers) David Crowder, Ed Cash (publishers) Alletrop Music, Inot Music, sixsteps Music, worshiptogether.com songs
"Blessings"
(writers) Allen Swoope, Asheton Hogan, Lecrae Moore, Maurice Simmonds, Tyrone Williams Griffin, Jr. (publishers) Asheton Hogan BMI Pub Designee, Eardrummers Entertainment LLC, Warner-Tamerlane Publishing Corp.
"Broken Things"
(writers) Andrew Jacob Pruis, Jason Houser, Matthew West (publisher) Housermania Music
"Control (Somehow You Want Me)"
(writers) Jason Ingram, Matt Bronleewe, Mike Donehey (publishers) Fellow Ships Music, No Alibis Publishing, So Essential Tunes
"Different"
(writers) Kyle Lee, Micah Tyler (publishers) Fair Trade Global Songs, Fair Trade Tunes, From The Void
"Hills and Valleys"
(writers) Chuck Butler, Jonathan Smith, Tauren Wells (publishers) Be Essential Songs, Crucial Music Entertainment, Jord A Lil Music, Not Just Another Song Publishing, So Essential Tunes
"I just need U."
(writers) Blake NeeSmith, Bryan Fowler, Kevin McKeehan (publisher) Achtober Songs, Blake Neesmith Publishing Designee, RELWOF, So Essential Tunes
"I'll Find You"
(writers) Danny Majic, John Mitchell, Justin Franks, Lecrae Moore, Natalie Sims, Sasha Sloan, Victoria Kelly (publishers) Artist 101 Publishing Group, Artist Publishing Group West, Danny Majic Music Publishing, Eardrummers Entertainment LLC, J Franks Publishing, John Mitchell Pub Designee, Mod Junkie, Sasha Sloan Publishing, Warner-Tamerlane Publishing Corp., WB Music Corp.
"O'Lord"
(writers) Joe Williams, Paul Mabury (publishers) FLYCHILD Publishing, Joe Williams Publishing Designee, So Essential Tunes
"Old Church Choir"
(writers) Colby Wedgeworth, Ethan Hulse, Zach Williams (publishers) Anthems of Hope, Be Essential Songs, Colby Wedgeworth Music, EGH Music, Fair Trade Music Publishing, Wisteria Drive
"Reckless Love"
(writers) Caleb Culver, Cory Asbury, Ran Jackson (publisher) Bethel Music Publishing, Richmond Park Publishing, Watershed Music Publishing
"So Will I (100 Billion X)"
(writers) Benjamin Hastings, Joel Houston, Michael Fatkin (publisher) Capitol CMG Publishing, Hillsong Music Publishing
"Unfinished"
(writers) Ben Glover, Colby Wedgeworth (publisher) 9t One Songs, Ariose Music, Colby Wedgeworth Music, Fair Trade Music Publishing

Worship Song of the Year
"Do It Again"
(writers) Chris Brown, Mack Brock, Matt Redman, Steven Furtick (publishers) Capitol CMG Publishing, Essential Music Publishing
"Reckless Love"
(writers) Caleb Culver, Cory Asbury, Ran Jackson (publishers) Bethel Music Publishing, Richmond Park Publishing, Watershed Music Publishing
"So Will I (100 Billion X)"
(writers) Benjamin Hastings, Joel Houston, Michael Fatkin (publishers) Capitol CMG Publishing, Hillsong Music Publishing
"Spirit of the Living God"
(writers) Jacob Sooter, Mia Fieldes (publisher) Essential Music Publishing
"Tremble"
(writers) Andres Figueroa, Hank Bentley, Mariah McManus, Mia Fieldes (publisher) Essential Music Publishing

Songwriter of the Year
Lecrae
Matthew West
Tauren Wells
TobyMac
Zach Williams

Songwriter of the Year (Non-artist)
Bryan Fowler
Colby Wedgeworth
Ethan Hulse
Jason Ingram
Jonathan Smith

Contemporary Christian Artist of the Year
for KING & COUNTRY, Word Label Group
MercyMe, Fair Trade Services
Tauren Wells, Provident Music Group
TobyMac, Capitol CMG
Zach Williams, Essential Records

Southern Gospel Artist of the Year
Bradley Walker, Gaither Music Group
Gaither Vocal Band, Gaither Music Group
Joseph Habedank, Daywind Records
Karen Peck & New River, Daywind Records
Mark Lowry, Daywind Records

Gospel Artist of the Year
CeCe Winans, Pure Springs Gospel / Thirty Tigers
Jekalyn Carr, Lunjeal Music Group
Kirk Franklin, RCA Inspiration
Tasha Cobbs Leonard, Motown Gospel
Travis Greene, RCA Inspiration

Artist of the Year
Hillsong UNITED, Hillsong Music Australia / Capital CMG
MercyMe, Fair Trade Services
NEEDTOBREATHE, Atlantic Records
Tasha Cobbs Leonard, Motown Gospel
Zach Williams, Provident Label Group

New Artist of the Year
Cory Asbury, Bethel Music
Koryn Hawthorne, RCA Inspiration
Mosaic MSC, Essential Worship
Pat Barrett, Capitol CMG
Tauren Wells, Provident Label Group

Producer of the Year
Ed Cash
David Garcia
Tommee Profitt
Wayne Haun
Jason Ingram and Paul Mabury (Team)
Kenneth Leonard Jr. and Natasha Leonard (Team)

Rap/Hip Hop 

Rap/Hip Hop Recorded Song of the Year
"Not Today Satan (feat. Andy Mineo)" – KB
(writers) Andrew Mineo, Chris Mackey, Jacob Cardec, Joseph Prielozny, Kevin Burgess
"War Cry (feat. Tauren Wells)" – Social Club Misfits
(writers) Andrew Wells, David Frank, Fernando Miranda, John Thomas Roach, Martin Santiago, Tommee Profitt
"SMILE" – Tedashii
(writers) Lasanna Harris, Marquis Rachad, Philip Green, Shama Joseph, Tedashii Anderson
"Forever" – Trip Lee
 (writers) Jacob Cardec, William Barfield
"Praying Hands (feat. Trip Lee)" – Ty Brasel
(writers) Kenneth Christian Mackey, Ty Brasel

Rap/Hip Hop Album of the Year
Today We Rebel – KB(producers) Benjamin Backus, Chris “Dirty Rice” Mackey, Clinton Lightfoot, David L. Baker, Dominique Hubbard, G Roc, Howard Reeves, Jacob Cardec, Joseph Prielozny, Mykallife, William JosiahCrooked – Propaganda
(producers) Courtland Urbano, Daniel Steele, JR
Into the Night – Social Club Misfits
(producers) 42 North, Andrew Wells, Beam, Ben Lopez, Daniel Steele, Elvin Wit Shahbazian, Jaime Zeluck Hindlin, Rey King

 Rock/Contemporary Rock/Contemporary Recorded Song of the Year"Walking on Water" – NEEDTOBREATHE(writers) Bear Rinehart, Bo Rinehart, Matt Maher"Gone" – RED
(writers) Anthony Armstrong, Jason McArthur, Michael Barnes, Randy Armstrong, Rob Graves
"Brave" – Skillet
(writers) John Cooper, Korey Cooper, Seth MosleyRock/Contemporary Album of the YearEverything Or Nothing –  Carrollton
(producers) Carrollton, John Mays, Scott Cash
Gone – Red
(producer) Rob GravesUnleashed Beyond – Skillet(producers) Brian Howes, Death Tiger, Jerricho Scroggins, Kane Churko, Kevin Churko, Mike X O'Connor, Seth Mosley, Solomon Olds Pop/Contemporary Pop/Contemporary Recorded Song of the Year"All My Hope" – Crowder
(writers) David Crowder, Ed Cash
"O'Lord" – Lauren Daigle
(writers) Joe Williams, Paul Mabury
"When We Pray" – Tauren Wells
(writers) Colby Wedgeworth, Ethan Hulse, Tauren Wells
"I just need U." – TobyMac
(writers) Blake NeeSmith, Bryan Fowler, Toby McKeehan"Old Church Choir" – Zach Williams(writers) Colby Wedgeworth, Ethan Hulse, Zach WilliamsPop/Contemporary Album of the YearWonder – Hillsong United
(producers) Joel Houston, Michael Guy Chislett   
Out of the Dark – Mandisa
(producers) Ben Glover, Bryan Fowler, Christopher Stevens, Colby Wedgeworth, David Garcia, Mike X O’Connor, Seth Mosley
All In – Matthew West
(producers) AJ Pruis, David Garcia, Pete Kipley
Different – Micah Tyler
(producers) Colby Wedgeworth, Hank Bentley, Kyle Lee  Hills and Valleys – Tauren Wells(producers) Bernie Herms, Brent Milligan, Casey Brown, Chuck Butler, Colby Wedgeworth, Jordan Sapp Southern Gospel Southern Gospel Recorded Song of the Year"He Can Take It" – Brian Free & Assurance
(writers) Jeff Bumgardner, Kenna Turner West, Sue C. Smith
"Clear Skies" – Ernie Haase & Signature Sound
(writers) Becca Mizell, Sam Mizell
"Hallelujah Band" – Gaither Vocal Band
(writers) Becca Mizell, Sam Mizell"Washed By The Water" – Jason Crabb(writers) Dave Barnes, Jason Crabb, Jordan Reynolds"Just When You Thought" – Joseph Habedank
(writers) Joseph Habedank, Michael Farren, Wayne HaunSouthern Gospel Album of the YearClear Skies – Ernie Haase & Signature Sound
(producers) Kris Crunk, Michael English, Trey Ivey, Virgil Stratford, Wayne Haun
We Have This Moment – Gaither Vocal Band
(producers) Bill Gaither, Gordon Mote 
Still Happy – Goodman Revival
(producers) Johnny Minick, Michael Sykes, Tanya Goodman Sykes
Hope For All Nations – Karen Peck & New River
(producer) Wayne HaunWhat's Not To Love – Mark Lowry(producer) Dony McGuire Bluegrass/Country/Roots Bluegrass/Country/Roots Recorded Song of the Year"I Will Someday (feat. The Isaacs)" – Bradley Walker
(writers) Chris Stapleton, Garnet Bowman, Morgane Hayes, Ronnie Bowman
"Little White Church House" – Gaither Vocal Band
(writers) Jonathan Smith, Mia Fieldes, Zach Williams
"Jailbreak" – Joseph Habedank
(writers) Gerald Crabb, Joseph Habedank"Dinner on the Ground (feat. the Oak Ridge Boys)" – Little Roy & Lizzy Show(writers) Jeff Bumgardner, Joel Lindsey, Wayne Haun"Daddy And Son" – The Nelons
(writers) Dony McGuire, Jason Clark, Reba Rambo-McGuireBluegrass/Country/Roots Album of the YearBlessed, Hymns and Songs of Faith – Bradley Walker(producers) Ben IsaacsSing It Again, A Collection of Favorites – Jeff & Sheri Easter
(producers) Greg Cole, Jeff Easter, Sheri Easter
Going Home – Little Roy & Lizzy Show
(producer) Jeff Easter, Trey Ivey, Wayne Haun

 Contemporary Gospel/Urban Contemporary Gospel/Urban Recorded Song of the Year"I Got That" – Anthony Brown & Group therAPy
(writer) Anthony Brown
"A Great Work" – Brian Courtney Wilson
(writers) Aaron W. Lindsey, Alvin Richardson, Brian Courtney Wilson
"Not Lucky, I’m Loved" – Jonathan McReynolds
(writers) Jonathan McReynolds, Terrell Demetrius Wilson"Won’t He Do It" – Koryn Hawthorne and Roshon Fegan(writer) Loren Hill, Makeba Riddick, Rich Shelton
"You (feat. Tye Tribbett)" – Snoop Dogg
(writers) Jovan J. Dawkins, Jevon Hill, Stanley Green Jr, Timothy Tyrone Bush Jr, Tye TribbettContemporary Gospel/Urban Album of the YearA Long Way From Sunday – Anthony Brown & group therAPy(producers) Adam Blackstone, Anthony Brown, Dana Sorey, Darryl Woodson Jr., Justin Savage, Warryn Campbell, Wow JonesA Great Work – Brian Courtney Wilson
(producers) Aaron Lindsey, Luther “Mano” Hanes, Shuan Martin, Warryn Campbell 
Make Room – Jonathan McReynolds
(producers) Darryl “Lil’ Man” Howell, Jonathan McReynolds
Snoop Dogg Presents Bible of Love – Snoop Dogg
(producers) B. Slade, Chris Johnson, Demetrius Sims, Derrick John, DJ Battlecat, Elvis “Blac Elvis” Williams, J Drew Sheard II, Jeremy Eudovique, Jevon Hill, John P Kee, Jovan Dawkins, KJ Conteh, Koshine, Lt Hutton, Lue, Scrapdolla, Soopafly, Stanley Green Jr, The B Wagon, Tony Russel, Tyrell Urquhart, Uncle Chucc, Warryn Campbell
The Bloody Win – Tye Tribbett
(producer) Jevon Hill, Tye Tribbett

 Traditional Gospel Traditional Gospel Recorded Song of the Year"Stay With Me" – Jekalyn Carr
(writer) Jekalyn Carr"Close" – Marvin Sapp(writer) Aaron Lindsey, Marvin Sapp, Solomon Edwards Jr"I Survived It" – Ricky Dillard & New G
(writers) Jason Clayborn, Ricky Dillard
"And You Don’t Stop" – The Walls Group
(writers) Affion Crockett, Ahjah Walls, Alic Walls, Eric Dawkins, Warryn Campbell
"He Got Up (feat. Dorinda Clark-Cole)" – VaShawn Mitchell
(writer) VaShawn MitchellTraditional Gospel Album of the YearOne Nation Under God – Jekalyn Carr(producer) Allen Carr10 – Ricky Dillard & New G
(producers) Ricky Dillard, Michael Taylor, Will Bogle
The Brooklyn Tabernacle Choir – I Am Reminded
(producers) Carol Cymbala, Bradley Knight

 Urban Worship Urban Worship Recorded Song of the Year"The Name Of Our God" – Tasha Cobbs Leonard
(writers) Jonas Myrin, Matt Redman, Natasha Leonard
"Your Great Name" – Todd Dulaney
(writers) Dontaniel Jamel Kimbrough, Todd Dulaney"You Waited" – Travis Greene(writer) Travis GreeneUrban Worship Album of the YearHeart. Passion. Pursuit. – Tasha Cobbs Leonard(producers) Kenneth Leonard Jr., Natasha LeonardYour Great Name – Todd Dulaney
(producers) Todd Dulaney, Dontaniel Jamel Kimbrough 
Crossover: Live From Music City – Travis Greene
(producers) Jevon Hill, Travis Greene

 Spanish Spanish Language Recorded Song of the Year"Sin Ti" – Alex Zurdo(writer) Alexis Velez"Dame Más" – Genessis & Nikki
(writers) Andy Delos Santo, Genessis Holguin, Nikki Holguin, Phil Sillas
"Lléname (feat. Evan Craft)" – Harold y Elena
(writers) Elena Witt-Guerra, Harold Guerra
"Danzo en el Río" – Miel San Marcos
(writers) Josh Morales, Luis Morales Jr 
"Agradecido (feat. Alex Campos)" – Ray Alonso
(writers) Ray Alonso, Yafet González, Emmanuel EspinosaSpanish Album of the YearImpulso – Evan Craft 
 (producer) Sean Cook
Revive (Spanish Version) – Lucia Parker
(producers) Israel Houghton, Jake Salomon
Cerca Estás – Marcela Gandara
(producers) Leslie Johnson, Marcela Gandara
Jesús Salva – Marcos Witt
(producers) Coalo Zamorano, Marcos Witt, Sergio Gonzalez, Pauly GarcíaPentecostés – Miel San Marcos(producers) Josue Morales, Luis Morales Jr., Samy Morales, Chris Rocha Worship Worship Recorded Song of the Year"Resurrection Power" – Chris Tomlin
(writers) Ed Cash, Ryan Ellis, Tony Brown
"Reckless Love" – Cory Asbury
(writers) Caleb Culver, Cory Asbury, Ran Jackson (publishers) Bethel Music Publishing, Richmond Park Publishing, Watershed Music Publishing"So Will I (100 Billion X)" – Hillsong UNITED(writers) Benjamin Hastings, Joel Houston, Michael Fatkin"Who You Say I Am" – Hillsong Worship
(writers) Ben Fielding, Reuben Morgan
"Tremble" – Mosaic MSC
 (writers) Andres Figueroa, Hank Bentley, Mariah McManus, Mia FieldesWorship Album of the YearReckless Love – Cory Asbury(producers) Jason Ingram, Paul MaburyThere Is More – Hillsong Worship
(producers) Michael Guy Chislett, Brooke Ligertwood
Love Has a Name – Jesus Culture
(producer) Jeremy Edwardson 
Good News – Rend Collective
(producers) Gareth Gilkeson, Bryan Fowler, Ed Cash, Ben Tan, Michael Fatkin
Bright Faith Bold Future – Vertical Worship
(producer) Jonathan Smith

 Other categories Instrumental Album of the YearPiano Chill: Songs of Faith – Christopher Phillips
(producer) Jack Jezzro A Thankful Heart – Craig Duncan(producer) Craig DuncanI'm Gonna Keep On – Jeff Stice
(producer) Jeff SticeChildren's Album of the YearBright Ones – Bright Ones(producers) Jacob Sooter, James G. Morales, Lael, Mike X O'Connor, Rick Seibold, Seth Mosley 
Be Held: Lullabies For The Beloved – Christy Nockels
(producer) Nathan Nockels 
Getty Kids Hymnal – For the Cause – Keith & Kristyn Getty
(producers) Keith Getty, Kristyn Getty, Fionan deBarra
Kathie Lee Gifford Presents The Little Giant – Kathie Lee Gifford
(producers) David Pomeranz, Mark Cabaniss, Kathie Lee Gifford
Mommy & Me Worship 2 – LifeWay
(producers) Craig Adams, Lynsey DelpChristmas / Special Event Album of the YearIt’s Finally Christmas – Casting Crowns
(producer) Mark A. Miller Christmas  Live In Phoenix – for KING & COUNTRY(producer) for KING & COUNTRY 
The Peace Project – Hillsong Worship
(producers) Michael Guy Chislett, Ben Tan
Light of Christmas – TobyMac
(producers) Bryan Fowler, David Garcia
Country Roots and Gospel Favorites (Live)  – Various Artists
(producers) Bill Gaither Musical of the YearChristmas Is in the Heart
(creators) Dale Mathews, Kenna Turner West, Steve W. MauldinHow to Have the Best Christmas Ever
(creators) Daniel Semsen, Heidi Petak, Jeff Bumgardner, Joel Lindsey
It Happened On A Sunday
(creators) Camp Kirkland, Cliff Duren, Jason Cox, Phil Nitz
Love Took His Breath Away
(creators) Bradley Knight, Joel Lindsey
Miracle In A Manger
(creators) Camp Kirkland, Cliff Duren, Phil Nitz, Tim Lovelace

Youth / Children's Musical of the Year
Angels Say What?!
(creators) Alisen Wells, Anna Clark, Nick Robertson
My Savior Lives
(creators) Dale Mathews, Dana Anderson
Nailed it!
(creators) Alisen Wells, Anna Clark, Nick Robertson

Choral Collection of the Year
Horizon
(creators) Prestonwood Choir
The Big Red Choir Book
(creators) Dale Mathews
The Reason
(creators) Travis Cottrell
Turn Your Radio On
(creators) Marty Parks
Your Word
(creators) Cliff Duren, Jeff Bumgardner

Recorded Music Packaging of the Year
Resurrection Letters: Vol. I – Andrew Peterson
(art director) Joshua Wurzelbacher (graphic designer) Brannon McAllister (photographer) Giles Clement (illustrator) Stephen Crotts
Bright Ones – Bright Ones
(art director) Lindsey Strand (graphic designer) Stephen Hart (photographer) Lucas Sankey
Where His Light Was – Kristene DiMarco
(art director) Kiley Goodpasture (graphic designer) Brianna Ailie (photographer) Stephen Hart and Lucas Sankey
Decade The Halls, Vol I – Tenth Avenue North(art director) Tim Parker (photographer) Eric BrownThe Other Side – The Walls Group
(Art Director) Tim Parker (graphic designer) David Navejas (photographer) Blair Campbell

 Videos and Films Short Form Video of the YearLove Won't Let Me Down – Hillsong Young & Free
(director) Jamin Tasker (producer) Johnny RaysI'll Find You (feat. Tori Kelly) – Lecrae(director) Mike Mihail (producers) Danny Majic, DJ Frank EGone – RED
(director) Matt DeLisi (producer) Ryan Atenhan
Dive (feat. Beam) – Social Club Misfits
(director and producer) Caleb Natale
Blackout – Steffany Gretzinger
(director) Bommy Kwon (producer) Lindsey Strand
I just need U. – TobyMac
(director) Eric Welch (producer) Andrew MolinaLong Form Video of the YearThere Is More – Hillsong Worship(director) Sebastian Strand (producer) Ben FieldLove Has a Name – Jesus Culture
(director and producer) Nathan Grubbs
The Garden Tour (Live) – Kari Jobe
(director and producer) Ezra Cohen
Whole Heart (Live) – Passion
(director) Rusty Anderson, (producers) Leighton Ching, Shelley Giglio
Country Roots and Gospel Favorites – Various Artists
(director) Doug Stuckey (producer) Bill GaitherInspirational Film of the YearGod's Not Dead: A Light in Darkness
(director) Michael Mason (producer) Pure Flix ProductionsI Can Only Imagine
(directors) The Erwin Brothers (producers) City on a Hill Productions, Imagine Rights, Kevin Downes Productions, LD Entertainment, Mission Pictures International, Toy Gun Films
Paul, Apostle of Christ
(director) Andrew Hyatt (producers) Affirm Films, ODB Films
Same Kind of Different As Me
(director) Michael Carney (producers) Disruption Entertainment, One October Films, Paramount Pictures, Reserve Entertainment, Skodam Films
The Star
(director) Timothy Reckart (producers) Affirm Films, Columbia Pictures Corporation, Franklin Entertainment, Sony Pictures Animation, The Jim Henson Company, Walden Media

References

External links 
 

2018 music awards
GMA Dove Awards
2018 in American music
2018 in Tennessee
GMA